Chantal Neuwirth (born 1948) is a French actress, who also played on theatre.

Theater

Filmography

References

External links

1948 births
Living people
French stage actresses
French film actresses
French television actresses